United Nations Security Council Resolution 258 was adopted on September 18, 1968. Concerned about growing instability in the Middle East, the Council demanded that the cease-fire they ordered be rigorously respected, reaffirmed resolution 242 and urged all parties to extend their fullest co-operation to the Special Representative of the Secretary-General.

The resolution was adopted with 14 votes to none;  Algeria abstained.

See also
Arab–Israeli conflict
List of United Nations Security Council Resolutions 201 to 300 (1965–1971)

References
Text of the Resolution at undocs.org

External links
 

 0258
 0258
September 1968 events